Qiandao may refer to:

Qiandao Lake, a human-made lake in Chun'an County, Zhejiang, China

Historical eras
Qiandao (乾道, 1067?–1068), era name used by Emperor Huizong of Western Xia
Qiandao (乾道, 1165–1173), era name used by Emperor Xiaozong of Song